Wiley Harold Piatt (July 13, 1874 – September 20, 1946) was a professional baseball player who played pitcher in the Major Leagues from 1898 to 1903. He played for the Philadelphia Phillies, Philadelphia Athletics, Chicago White Sox, and Boston Beaneaters.

Piatt was the only pitcher in the 20th century to pitch two complete games in one day and lose them both.  This occurred on June 25, 1903, when, pitching for the Beaneaters, he lost to the St. Louis Cardinals by scores of 1-0 and 5-3.

References

External links

1874 births
1946 deaths
Major League Baseball pitchers
Baseball players from Ohio
Philadelphia Phillies players
Philadelphia Athletics players
Boston Beaneaters players
Chicago White Sox players
People from Adams County, Ohio
19th-century baseball players
Dayton Old Soldiers players
Nashville Vols players
Toledo Mud Hens players
Paducah Indians players
Charlotte Hornets (baseball) players